Şahinbeyler is a village in the Sincik District, Adıyaman Province, Turkey. Its population is 261 (2021).

References

Villages in Sincik District
Kurdish settlements in Adıyaman Province